Kalavashk (also Romanized as Kalāvashk and Kalāveshk; also known as Jaghatāi, Kalāveshk-e Kūchak, Kalāveshk-e Kūchek, and Kalāyeshk) is a village in Beyhaq Rural District, Sheshtomad District, Sabzevar County, Razavi Khorasan Province, Iran. At the 2006 census, its population was 68, in 19 families.

References 

Populated places in Sabzevar County